Kautokeino is a municipality in Troms og Finnmark county, Norway. The administrative centre of the municipality is the village of Guovdageaidnu/Kautokeino. Other villages include Láhpoluoppal and Máze.

The  municipality is the largest by area out of the 356 municipalities in Norway. Kautokeino is the 235th most populous municipality in Norway with a population of 2,877.

Guovdageainnu-Kautokeino is one of two cultural centers of Northern Sápmi today (the other being Kárášjohka-Karasjok). The most significant industries are reindeer herding, theatre/movie industry, and the public education system. Kautokeino is one of the coldest places in the Nordics.

General information

The municipality of Kautokeino was established in 1851 when the southern part of the old Kistrand municipality was separated to form this new municipality. Initially, there were 869 residents in the new municipality. The municipal boundaries have not changed since that time.

On 1 January 2020, the municipality became part of the newly formed Troms og Finnmark county. Previously, it had been part of the old Finnmark county.

Name
The first element in Guovdageainnu is guovda which means "middle" or "half" and the last element is geainnu which means "road". Combined it means "half way", since the location is halfway between two traditional migrating points. It is also the geographic centre of Northern Sápmi. Kautokeino is a Finnicized form of the Sámi name Guovdageainnu, and it is also used by Norwegians.

The name of the municipality was Kautokeino until 1987 when it was changed to Guovdageaidnu-Kautokeino.  It was the first municipality in Norway to get a Sami name. In 2005, the name was again changed, such that either Guovdageainnu or Kautokeino can be used.

Coat of arms

The coat of arms was granted on 4 September 1987. The official blazon is "Azure, a lavvo Or". This means the arms have a blue field (background) and the charge is a lavvo (also spelled lavvu). The lavvo has a tincture of Or which means it is commonly colored yellow, but if it is made out of metal, then gold is used. The lavvu (often spelled as 'lavvo') is still in use by reindeer herders who follow their herds according to the season and food availability of food for the animals, and so it was chosen as the symbol for the municipality. The arms were designed by Arvid Sveen.

History

The ice age 
The area where the Kautokeino settlement is located became ice-free approximately 10,500 years ago after the last Ice age. The northern part of today's Kautokeino municipality became ice-free first, approximately 500–800 years before the area where the settlement of Kautokeino is located today. The ice edge retreated south before disappearing completely from Fennoscania 9,600 years ago, most recently in Sarek in Sweden.

The stone age 
In Kautokeino there are traces of human activity stretching back 7,000–9,000 years. The people entering the Kautokeino area when the ice retreated has belonged to one of the three main genetic groups in the postglacial period of early Europe; Eastern Hunter-Gatherers ,Western Hunter-Gatherers or the Scandinavian Hunter-Gatherers. At Kautokeino church, arrowheads have been found where the dating extends over a large period of time. The oldest arrowheads date to 5000–7000 BC, while the youngest date to 1000–000 BC. In 2020, the University of Tromsø conducted archaeological excavations at Gáidnomanjávri I Kautokeino, approximately 300 meters northeast of the church. There, among other things, burnt bone remains were found, the oldest of which were dated to 4846-5009 BC.

In Juntevađđa, about 10 kilometers north of Kautokeino, archaeological excavations were carried out in 2018. The results from the samples show that there has been human activity in the area which has been dated back to 5560–5520 BC, mesolithic period. Among other things, bone remains of reindeer were identified.

The iron age 
Junttevađđa has traces of human activity spanning a long period of time. In 1967, the archaeologist Povl Simonsen excavated at Junttevađđa, where he uncovered a total of 10 stone piles that lay in a row at intervals of between 5 and 13 metres. He found layers of charcoal in the stone piles, and thought these were fire pits. These stone piles are dated to approximately AD 1050. However, later research has concluded that it is not fire pits, but solid hearths associated with tent settlements that have been used by the Sami population.

1550–1751 
Until 1751, Kautokeino was part of Sweden.

There is little written source material about Kautokeino from before around 1550. From 1553, Gustav Vasa's bailiffs began systematic taxation of the Sami in the Kautokeino area. There are tax lists from 1553 to 1608, except for the year 1565. In addition, there is an overview of the population and accounting list for 1553. Peter Lorenz Smith writes in the book Kautokeino og Kautokeino lappene: a historical and ergological regional study from 1938 that the "lapp village" in Kautokeino had 8 people in the tax man count in 1553. Today, the term siida is used for what Smith called "lapp village". He further estimates the total population of the Kautokeino siida to 48 people based on an assumption of 6 people per household. In the Swedish tax accounts from 1553, Kautokeino is called the town of Kwothekyla. Smith believes it may be a combination of the words goahti (Sami for a large tent) and kylla (Finnish for hamlet). The siida was located on Goahtedievva, which is near today's Kautokeino church. Findings from the Stone Age to our time show that the area has been influenced by human activity for 9,000 years.

In addition to the siida in Kautokeino, there was also a siida at Lahpojávri within today's Kautokeino municipality. In 1553 there were 6 people in the tax census and with Smith's assumption of 6 people per household a population of 36 people.

The first priest to hold a service in Kautokeino was Johannes Torneaus from Övertorneå. This happened in 1641. The service was held in a small log cabin that had just been set up. It is said to have been Kautokeino's first wooden building. Today, the rest of this log cabin is preserved in the Kautokeino museum.

The first resident priest was Swedish Amund Isaksen Curtelius. He wintered in Masi from 1674 to 1675.  He was succeeded by Johan Tornberg. In 1682 he was again succeeded by his brother, Anders Nicolai Tornensis. Tornensis had a vicarage built in Kautokeino, and started construction of Kautokeino's old church in 1701. The church was consecrated on 11 February 1703, and was named "St. Charles' Church". The old Kautokeino church was consecrated as a church for 241 years and 296 days before it was burned down by the German occupation forces on 3 December 1944, and was then Finnmark's oldest Protestant church.

1752–1940 
In 1845, measurements were made for Struve Geodetic Arc at the mountain tops of Lodiken (Luvdiidcohkka) and Bealjasvarri in Kautokeino.

In 1852, Kautokeino was the site of a Sami uprising against representatives of the Norwegian authorities. This was one of the few violent reactions by the Sami against the exploitation policies of the Norwegian government and was the only known confrontation between Samis and Norwegians with loss of human lives.

World War 2

1940–1943 
During the war at the Narvik front in the spring of 1940, four soldiers from Kautokeino took part; they belonged to the Alta Battalion.

In August 1940, four German soldiers came to Kautokeino by riverboat; they were the first German soldiers on the scene. They traveled again, and there was no permanent German presence in Kautokeino until the winter of 1941. Then they requisitioned the boarding school for accommodation.

A Serbian prisoner of war named Bora Ivankovic was arrested by the Germans in autumn 1942 and executed in Kautokeino. Together with Petar Filipovic, he had managed to escape from the prison camp in Karasjok. After 28 days on the run, Petar Filipovic managed to get into Sweden.

In 1942, the Germans planned to build a railway line through Kautokeino municipality. The line was to go via Reisadalen to Kautokeino and on to Karasjok. The railway was part of the German Polar Railway, which was planned to run all the way from Fauske to Kirkenes. The plan was stated in 1943.

In 1943, the Germans built a field airport with a runway of 1,200 meters in Kautokeino. At the end of the runway there is still the wreckage of a German Junkers Ju 52.

1944 

The Sámi author Odd Mathis Hætta writes in the book Samebygder på Finnmarksvidda 2 about 3 Serbian prisoners who had escaped from a prison camp and who were surprised and taken by the Germans and executed. This happened at Áidejávri, 30 kilometers south of Kautokeino in August 1944. The bodies were dug up and transported to Kautokeino by Norwegian soldiers in the spring of 1945. It is likely that they were not Serbian prisoners but from another nationality, this since the Serbian prisoners were held captive in Karasjok from 23 July 1942 to 15 December 1942, and this incident happened two years later.

A German Focke-Wulf Fw 189 reconnaissance aircraft made an emergency landing on 15 October 1944 at Flyvarjávri 13 kilometers south of Kautokeino. The water was named Flyvarjávri as a result of the accident, which means "plane lake" in Sámi.

In the autumn of 1944, the German 139th Mountain Brigade was stationed in and around Kautokeino. The force consisted of approximately 5,000 soldiers and had arrived in the Kautokeino area no later than 29 October 1944. The 139th Mountain Brigade was formed on 5 June 1944 from the remnants of the 139th Mountain Regiment from the 3rd Mountain Division.  The commander of the brigade in the Kautokeino area was Colonel Schirmbacker. He was on loan from the 6th SS Gebirgsjäger division. Incidentally, the 139th Mountain Regiment was the German unit that was about to be defeated by Norwegian forces at Bjørnfjell in June 1940, during the battles of Narvik before Norway had to capitulate when the Allies withdrew. Alta Battalion, where soldiers from Kautokeino also participated, were among the Norwegian units that took part in the battles at Bjørnfjell. The Austrian soldier Toni Russold took part in the battle against the Alta battalion in Narvik in 1940, and was part of the force that made up the flank protection in Kautokeino in the autumn of 1944.

The brigade's mission in Kautokeino in the autumn of 1944 was to form the flank protection for the Sturmbock-Stellun line which ran across the Finnish wedge north of Karesuando. The Germans established the positions at Kautokeino since they feared an Allied landing at Hammerfest and an attack via Alta, straight south towards Finland across the Finnmarksvidda with the aim of cutting off the 20th Mountains Armys 18th Army Corps' retreat out of Finland through the Finnish wedge. South and southwest of Kautokeino, defensive positions were established at Máttavárri, Joppevárri, Áddjit, Gálggovárri and Junkkavárri. The last German soldiers withdrew from the position in Kautokeino on 3 January 1945. The route they followed was a makeshift cart road that went south-west from Kautokeino to Goathteluoppal, on to Hirvas in Finland and finally the road through the Finnish wedge to Skibotn in Norway. In June 2022, shells were found in the area around the German positions from 1944 at Máttavárri, 5 kilometers south of Kautokeino. In the autumn of 1941, only 100 of the 2,000 soldiers were left from the 139th Mountain Regiment of those who had taken part in the campaign in Narvik, in that sense Toni Russold's period in the regiment and the brigade, from the campaign in Narvik all the way to Kautokeino in the autumn of 1944, must have been one of the longest.

On 23 October 1944, a meeting was held in Kautokeino with representatives of the Germans, the Nazi police, police chief Hoem and representatives of Kautokeino municipality. The municipality reached an agreement with the Nazis and the Germans that the population of Kautokeino together with the large herds of reindeer should evacuate to the Helligskogen in Troms and meet the Germans there. The Germans wanted to take control of the reindeer herds because it constituted a large food reserve for the Germans, they wanted to prevent the Allies from getting hold of this food reserve, and because they feared that Soviet red army could use driving reindeer for transport, in a similar way to reindeer had been used for transport on the Murmansk front. The agreement was announced to the population in Norwegian. However, the verbal order to the population was given in Sámi and there the population was asked to evacuate to Helligskogen at Anarjohka in the east. Police Chief Hoem was aware that the oral order in Sámi was different from the written order in Norwegian. The population had to leave Kautokeino by 30 November 1944. The result was that the population listened to the oral order in Sámi and failed to evacuate to the Helligskogen in Troms, instead they escaped to the Finnmarksvidda and spread out over a large area. The Germans missed out on the meat reserve that the reindeer herds would have represented, and the population avoided forced evacuation. Of Kautokeino's 1,330 inhabitants, 47 were forcibly evacuated south. The fate of two women who fell ill and were forcibly evacuated south is still unknown.

Kautokeino was burned down by retreating German forces. The Germans began the burning of the Kautokeino church site on November 20, 1944, and the burning was completed in the first week of December. Of 220 buildings, 168 were burned, including the old Kautokeino church from 1701, which was burned on December 3, 1944.

2000 to present 
In August 2016, the third Sápmi Pride LGBT festival was moved to Kautokeino to protest that the local church council refused to wed gays and lesbians in its church, and to protest that the lead priest for the parish said that homosexuality is something that people can rid themselves of.

Churches
The Church of Norway has one parish  within the municipality of Kautokeino. It is part of the Indre Finnmark prosti (deanery) in the Diocese of Nord-Hålogaland.

Government
All municipalities in Norway, including Kautokeino, are responsible for primary education (through 10th grade), outpatient health services, senior citizen services, unemployment and other social services, zoning, economic development, and municipal roads. The municipality is governed by a municipal council of elected representatives, which in turn elect a mayor.  The municipality falls under the Indre Finnmark District Court and the Hålogaland Court of Appeal.

Municipal council
The municipal council  of Kautokeino is made up of 19 representatives that are elected to four year terms. The party breakdown of the council is as follows:

Mayors
The mayors of Kautokeino:

1853-1857: Frederik Waldermar Hvoslef
1857-1859: Andreas Edevard Berger 
1859-1861: Ole Isaksen Hætta 
1861-1867: Carl Adolph Moe 
1867-1869: Ole Isaksen Hætta 
1869-1871: Ludvig Kristoffer Olavius Strømme
1871-1873: Morten Clemetsen 
1873-1875: Ole Andreas Johannessen 
1875-1877: Morten Clemetsen 
1877-1879: Ole Andreas Johannessen 
1879-1881: L. Larsen 
1881-1888: Georg Karelius Nordrum 
1888-1900: Henrik Pentha 
1900-1904: Johannes Mathisen Hætta 
1917-1922:	Peter Lorenz de Ferry Smith
1923-1934:	Lyder Aarseth
1935-1940:	Ludvig Johan Madsen 
1941-1945:	Morten M. Klemetsen
1946-1947:	Jan K. Lund 
1948-1955: Alfred Larsen 
1956–1963: Arvid Dahl (V)
1964-1969: Lauri Abiel Keskitalo (H)
1970-1971: Oddmund Sandvik 
1972-1973: Lauri Abiel Keskitalo (H)
1974-1975: Oddmund Sandvik 	
1976-1977: Mathis Mathisen Sara (LL)
1978–1979: Klemet O. Hætta (H)
1980–1981: Ole Henrik Buljo (Sp)
1982–1983: Klemet O. Hætta (H)
1984–1987: Ole Henrik Buljo (Sp)
1988–1991: Ellen Inga O. Hætta (H)
1992–1993: Ole Henrik Buljo (Sp)
1994–1999: Anton Dahl (V)
1999–2003: Jan Ole Buljo (Sp)
2003–2015: Klemet Erland Hætta (SáB)
2015-2019: Johan Vasara (Ap)
2019–present: Hans Isak Olsen (LL)

Geography

Guovdageaidnu/Kautokeino is the southernmost municipality of Finnmark county and it shares a border with several municipalities: Alta Municipality to the north, Kárášjohka - Karasjok Municipality to the east, Nordreisa Municipality and Kvænangen Municipality (in Troms county) to the west, and Enontekiö Municipality (in Finland) to the south.

At , it is the largest municipality in Norway. A total of approximately 10,000 lakes cover . A significant part of the Finnmarksvidda  plateau is located inside Kautokeino municipality. Øvre Anárjohka National Park is partially located in the municipality. The rivers Anarjohka and Karasjohka have their headwaters inside the park.

The Guovdageaidnu-Kautokeino River runs from a lake at the Finnish border, north through the villages of Guovdageaidnu (Kautokeino) and Máze before it leaves into Alta municipality and changes name to Altaelva. The river is collectively known as the Kautokeino/Alta-vassdraget and was the site of a major political controversy in the late 1970s and early 1980s. The lake Šuoikkatjávri is located on the border of the municipality with Kvænangen. Other lakes in the municipality include Bajášjávri, Bajit Spielgajávri, Biggejávri, Čárajávri, Dátkojávri, Gahččanjávri, Gavdnjajávri, Geađgejávri, Geašjávri, Guolehis Suolojávri, Heammojávri, Iešjávri, Láhpojávri, Latnetjávri, Nuorbejávri, Rágesjávri, Sálganjávri, Soagŋojávri, Stuora Galbajávri, Stuorajávri, Šuoikkatjávri, Suolojávri, Virdnejávri, and Vuolit Spielgajávri.

Climate
Kautokeino has a subarctic climate (Dfc) with cool to mild summers and long, cold and fairly dry winters. Kautokeino is the coldest town in mainland Norway by annual mean temperature. The all-time low  was recorded in January 1999. The all-time high  was recorded in July 2018, which was the warmest month recorded with mean  and average daily high . The coldest month on record is, as for much of Norway, February 1966.

Guovdageaidnu-Kautokeino is located in the Arctic highlands of the Finnmarksvidda plateau of Northern Norway. During five weeks of summer, the sun doesn't set, and during six weeks of winter, the sun doesn't rise.

While this is nice for humans, the temperature, combined with 10,000 lakes, makes it a haven for mosquitos. Consequently, both humans and reindeer tend to flee to the coast for the summer. The average date for the last overnight freeze (low below ) in spring is 31 May and average date for first freeze in autumn is 19 August giving an average frost-free season of 79 days (1981-2010 average).

While winter usually lasts from mid-October until well into April, the hard winter is only for December–February.

Birdlife
Lying south in the county, and bordering with Finland, Guovdageaidnu/Kautokeino has a very interesting birdlife. There are virtually thousands of lakes in the municipality, and these combined with the Altaelva waterway system provide habitats for a whole host of wetland species. Whooper swan can sometimes be found while spotted redshank are not uncommon.

Transportation
The small Kautokeino Airport is located in the village, but it has no commercial services. European route E45 runs through Kautokeino, part of the shortest and fastest route between western Finnmark and southern Scandinavia.

Population
In the village of Guovdageaidnu/Kautokeino, about 1,300 of the 3,000 people in the municipality reside. The village of Máze has about 400 people, while the remaining people in the municipality live in 14 smaller villages scattered around the area. The population has been declining about 3% over the last 10 years.

Guovdageaidnu/Kautokeino has different demographics than Finnmark county and Norway as a whole: more than 50% of the population is younger than 30 years. Also, the number of people older than 66 years is half of the national average. The gender ratio amounts to 86 women for every 100 men.  For the last couple of years, Kautokeino has been plagued by high rates of unemployment, peaking at 10% in 2006/2007.

A survey conducted on behalf of the Sami Language Council in the year 2000 showed that 96 percent of the population are Sami speakers.

Villages
In addition to the administrative centre of Guovdageaidnu (Kautokeino), the municipality has 15 smaller villages:

Máze (Masi) is the largest of the villages. Máze is located in a river valley. There is a school and Masi Church located in Máze. The current church has 150 seats and was built of wood in 1965. The first chapel was built in the 17th century. The second by Thomas von Westen in 1721. This church was burnt during World War II in 1944. The village was the site of a major political controversy in the late 1970s and early 80s, when it was proposed to flood village to build a large hydroelectric dam.
Láhpoluoppal is a village located northeast of Guovdageaidnu at the southern end of the Láhppojávri lake. The village has a school, Láhpoluoppal Chapel, and mountain hut. The chapel has 70 seats and was built in 1967.
Šihččajávri is located southeast of Guovdageaidnu (Kautokeino) village. The Norwegian Meteorological Institute has a weather observation station in the village, and often the place has the lowest temperature in Norway.
During the Sami revolt in Guovdageaidnu, the group of Samis that captured the rebellions was organized here.
Siebe is a village south of Guovdageaidnu.
Mieron is a village north of Guovdageaidnu. Many of the Samis who traveled to Canada to teach the Inuit about reindeer herding were from Mieron.
Stornes is a village north of Guovdageaidnu. Close to Stornes is a slate field with distinct green quartzite marketed as Naranas. 
Šuoššjávri is a village northeast of Guovdageaidnu near the border with Karasjok with a chapel and a mountain hut. The chapel was built in 1968 and has 75 seats.
The village has a mountain hut (called Madame Bongos fjellstue).
Suolovuopmi is north of Guovdageaidnu near the border with Alta. It is the location of a mountain hut, and is used for metrological observations.
Gálaniitu is southwest of Guovdageaidnu and has a mountain hut.
Áidejávri is south of Guovdageaidnu close to the Finnish border.
Ákšomuotki (Økseidet) is south of Guovdageaidnu.

Institutions and media
Several Sámi institutions are located in Guovdageaidnu/Kautokeino, including:

 Beaivváš Sámi Theatre. The National Sámi Theatre. As a national stage company, they play a major role in making Sámi history and culture visible.
 Sámi Joatkkaskuvla ja Boazodoalloskuvla is the Sámi High School and Reindeer Herding School. The high school has emphasis on Sámi, rather than Norwegian culture. Most teachers speak Sámi as their mother tongue allowing for classes to be taught in Sámi. In addition to ordinary courses, students can also study duodji (traditional Sámi crafts) and reindeer herding. In fact, it is the only high school in the world that features a reindeer herding class.
 Sámi allaskuvla - the Sámi University College. The college has national responsibility for Sámi higher education, including teacher-, and journalist-training. The college attempts to develop the syllabuses on the basis of Sámi needs, and attempts to develop Sámi as an academic language.
 Nordic Sámi Institute. The Nordic Sámi Institute is a Sámi research institution. Research topics include the Sámi language, culture, reindeer husbandry and legal research. The institute published the DIEĐUT magazine.
 Sámi giellaossodat; The department of language at the Norwegian Sami Parliament. This department is the administration for the Sámi language board, it allocates the extra funding given to the municipalities that have Sámi as an official language (like Guovdageaidnu-Kautokeino), and it administrates various projects related to Sámi languages.
 The department of education of the Norwegian Sami Parliament.

The Sámi are also internationally active with regards to indigenous people issues and reindeer husbandry. Therefore, the following institutions are also located in Guovdageaidnu/Kautokeino:
 Resource Centre for the Rights of Indigenous Peoples. The center attempts to collect, organize, and disseminate the knowledge and understanding of indigenous peoples' and Sami peoples' rights.
 International Centre For Reindeer Husbandry.

Guovdageaidnu/ Kautokeino is home to the following Sami media companies:
 Ávvir a Sami language newspaper.
 DAT Sami publishing house and record company.

Cultural events

Guovdageaidnu-Kautokeino is perhaps the cultural center of Northern Sámi today, and hosts several of the most well known Sami cultural events. The biggest event is the Sámi Easter Festival. Easter has traditionally been the time when the Sámis gather to celebrate weddings and confirmations. Today, also the Sami culture is celebrated with many yoik concerts, Sami theater shows, reindeer races, snowmobile races, ice fishing competitions, parties, and the Sámi Grand Prix; a Sámi version of the Eurovision Song Contest where in addition to the best song, the best yoik is also selected. In addition, the Sami Film Festival is usually held during the Easter, which is notable for having an outdoor cinema made of snow.

In June, the annual Guovdageaidnu-Kautokeino Walk/Bicycle Ride, has Sámis return to Guovdageaidnu-Kautokeino, just to walk a few kilometers, or ride a bicycle for twice the distance.

In August, there is the White Fish festival, as well as the Autumn Festival. The latter is a weekend-long party full of concerts, but also includes snowmobile skipping races on the (unfrozen) river. If the riders go too slow or make too sharp a turn, the snowmobile sinks.

Notable residents

1852 Kautokeino uprising 
 Aslak Hætta (1824–1854) a leader of the Sami revolt in Guovdageaidnu, called the Kautokeino Rebellion
 Mons Somby (1825 in Kautokeino – 1854) a leader of the Sami rioters
 Ellen Aslaksdatter Skum (1827 in Kautokeino – 1895) a Norwegian Sami reindeer herder, who took part in the 1852 Kautokeino uprising
 Lars Hætta (1834 in Kautokeino – 1896) a Norwegian Sami reindeer herder, prisoner, wood carver and Bible translator

Public Service 
 Johan Turi (1854 in Kautokeino – 1936) the first Sami author to publish a secular work in a Sami language
 Edel Hætta Eriksen (born 1921 in Kautokeino) a Norwegian schoolteacher and politician
 Lajla Mattsson Magga (born 1942) a Southern Sami teacher, children's writer and lexicographer, lives in Kautokeino
 Ole Henrik Magga (born 1947) a Sámi linguist, professor and politician from Kautokeino; the first president of the Sami Parliament of Norway and currently the president of the United Nations Permanent Forum on Indigenous Issues
 Ellen Inga O. Hætta (born 1953 in Kautokeino – 2023) a Norwegian Sami school principal and politician
 Berit Marie Eira (born 1968) Norwegian Sami reindeer owner and politician, works in Kautokeino municipality
 Unni Turrettini  (born 1972 in Kautokeino) a writer, lawyer, citizen activist and international speaker; author of The Mystery of the Lone Wolf Killer: Anders Behring Breivik and the Threat of Terror in Plain Sight.
 Barbro-Lill Hætta-Jacobsen (born 1972 in Kautokeino) a physician and Norwegian politician
 Inger Elin Utsi (born 1975) a Norwegian-Sami politician and actor, grew up in Kautokeino and lives in Alta
 Láilá Susanne Vars (born 1976 in Láhpoluoppal) a Norwegian-Sami lawyer and former politician, academic and first Sámi women to achieve a PhD in law, expert member of the United Nations Permanent Forum on Indigenous Issues

The Arts 
 Ailo Gaup (1944 in Kautokeino - 2014) a Sámi author, involved in founding the Sámi theater Beaivváš Sámi Theatre
 Nils Gaup (born 1955 in Kautokeino) a Sámi film director, Academy Award nominee for Pathfinder 
 Ellen Marie Vars (born 1957 in Láhpoluoppal) a Norwegian Sami writer
 Mattis Hætta (born 1959 in Masi) a Norwegian Sami singer, represented Norway in the Eurovision Song Contest 1980
 Ingor Ánte Áilo Gaup (born 1960 in Kautokeino) a Sámi actor, composer and folk musician
 Johan Sara (born 1963 in Alta) a Sami musician and composer, producer, teacher, arranger and actor
 Roger Ludvigsen (born 1965 in Alta) a Sami guitarist, percussionist and composer from Kautokeino
 Sollaug Sárgon (born 1965 in Kautokeino) a Norwegian Sami poet and child protective pedagogue
 Niko Valkeapää (born 1968 in Enontekiö, Finland) a Sami musician and joiker (Sami folk singer), winner of the Norwegian Spelemannsprisen in 2004; lives in Kautokeino
 Rawdna Carita Eira (born 1970) a Norwegian and Sámi playwright and author, lives in Kautokeino
 Sara Margrethe Oskal (born 1970 in Kautokeino) a Norwegian Sami writer, actress, artisan, director and film producer 
 Máret Ánne Sara (born 1983) a Sami artist and author, lives and works in Kautokeino
 Unni Turrettini (born 1972 in Kautokeino) a Norwegian attorney, international speaker and best selling author
 Fred Buljo (born 1988 in Kautokeino) a Sámi rapper and member of supergroup KEiiNO, named after the village

Sport 
 Håvard Klemetsen (born 1979 in Kautokeino) a Nordic combined skier with a gold and bronze team medals at the FIS Nordic World Ski Championships

References

External links

 Kautokeino Municipality Official Website  
 Municipal fact sheet from Statistics Norway 
 Destinasjon Kautokeino Tourist office  
 Kautokeino.Com is the major online "meeting point"  
 Sámi Joatkkaskuvla ja Boazodoalloskuvla 
 Sámi University College
 Beaivvas Sámi Teahter
 kautokeino.net News and information about events in Kautokeino

 
Municipalities of Troms og Finnmark
Sámi-language municipalities
Populated places of Arctic Norway
1851 establishments in Norway
Populated places established in 1851